Tunica vasculosa can refer to:
 Tunica vasculosa lentis
 Tunica vasculosa testis
 Tunica vasculosa bulbi